Dryden is an unincorporated community in Josephine County, Oregon, United States. It is located in the Deer Creek Valley about five miles east of Selma. As of 1990 only one house remained; the 1920 structure formerly served as the Dryden Store and post office.

History
Dryden was named for English poet and playwright John Dryden by local pioneer J. P. Mills, who was an avid reader. Dryden post office was established in 1892; it closed in 1956. At one time Dryden also had a school.

References

External links

Unincorporated communities in Josephine County, Oregon
1892 establishments in Oregon
Populated places established in 1892
Unincorporated communities in Oregon